The 2003 New Hampshire Wildcats football team was an American football team that represented the University of New Hampshire as a member of the Atlantic 10 Conference during the 2003 NCAA Division I-AA football season. In its fifth year under head coach Sean McDonnell, the team compiled a 5–7 record (3–6 against conference opponents) and tied for eighth place out of eleven teams in the Atlantic 10 Conference.

Schedule

References

New Hampshire
New Hampshire Wildcats football seasons
New Hampshire Wildcats football